Jakob is a given name.

 Jakob Ammann (1644–1712–1730), Anabaptist leader and namesake of the Amish religious movement
 Jakob Chychrun (born 1998), Canadian-American ice hockey player
 Jakob Dylan (born 1969), American singer and songwriter
 Jakob Fugger of the Lily (1459–1525), also known as Jakob Fugger the Rich
 Jakob Kasimir Hellrigl, known as Candy Ken, Austrian rapper and model
 Jakob Johnson (born 1994), American football player
Jakob Junis (born 1992), American baseball pitcher for the San Francisco Giants
 Jacob Lissek (born 1992), American soccer player 
 Jakob Oftebro (born 1986), Norwegian actor
 Jacob Paulson (born 1998), Australian rapper, singer, and songwriter, known professionally as JK-47
 Jakob Poulsen (born 1983), Danish football player
 Jakob Pöltl (born 1995), Austrian basketball player 
 Jakob Reinhard (1742–1787), also known as Hannikel
 Jakob Silfverberg (born 1990), Swedish ice hockey player
 Jakob Sølvhøj (born 1954), Danish politician
 Jakob Sporrenberg (1902–1952), German Nazi SS officer executed for war crimes
 Jakob Stausholm, Danish businessman
 Jakob Weiseborn (1892–1939), German Nazi SS Flossenbürg concentration camp commandant

See also
Jacob (name)

Given names
Masculine given names
Danish masculine given names
German masculine given names
Icelandic masculine given names
Swedish masculine given names
Norwegian masculine given names
Scandinavian masculine given names